Essence is the sixth studio album by American singer-songwriter Lucinda Williams, released on June 5, 2001, by Lost Highway Records. The album debuted on the Billboard 200 at No. 28, selling approximately 44,500 copies in its first week. By 2008, it had sold 336,000 copies in the U.S.

A critical and commercial success, the album earned Williams three Grammy Award nominations in 2002: Best Contemporary Folk Album, Best Female Pop Vocal Performance for the title track, and Best Female Rock Vocal Performance for the track "Get Right with God", which she won.

Critical reception

Essence was met with widespread critical acclaim. At Metacritic, which assigns a normalized rating out of 100 to reviews from professional publications, the album received an average score of 82, based on 11 reviews. Reviewers observed a departure from Williams' similarly acclaimed 1998 album Car Wheels on a Gravel Road, with Rolling Stone citing the "willful intimacy" in Essences music and Spin contrasting the "halting, spare" presentation with its predecessor's "giddy, verbose" one. AllMusic similarly stated "those hoping for another dose of the bluesy roots rock of Car Wheels on a Gravel Road may be disappointed, but if you want to take a deep and compelling look into the heart and soul of a major artist, then you owe it to yourself to hear Essence.

The Village Voice critic Robert Christgau found it "imperfect" but still praised Williams' artistry, saying "[she] is too damn good to deny." Salon regarded the album as "an emotional mess of a masterpiece". Entertainment Weekly wrote "Lucinda Williams doesn’t merely wallow in suffering. She savors it like a glass of your finest Bordeaux", and called it her "folkiest, gentlest album" and "a steamy slow-crawl — southern humidity as music — that plays into her strengths as the Joan of Dark of the alt-country set". Q listed Essence as one of the best 50 albums of 2001.

Awards

Track listing
All tracks written by Lucinda Williams.
"Lonely Girls" – 4:01
"Steal Your Love" – 3:14
"I Envy the Wind" – 3:12
"Blue" – 3:52
"Out of Touch" – 5:25
"Are You Down" – 5:24
"Essence" – 5:50
"Reason to Cry" – 3:39
"Get Right with God" – 4:16
"Bus to Baton Rouge" – 5:50
"Broken Butterflies" – 5:41

Personnel

 Lucinda Williams – vocals, acoustic guitar
 Jim Keltner – drums
 Tony Garnier – bass, acoustic guitar
 Bo Ramsey – electric guitar
 Charlie Sexton – drums, hand drum, rhythm guitar, Hammond B3 organ, piano, background vocals, tremolo slide guitar
 Reese Wynans – Hammond B3 organ
 Jim Lauderdale – harmony vocals

Additional musicians:

 David Mansfield – viola
 Ryan Adams – tremolo guitar ("Essence")
 Gary Louris – background vocals ("Essence")
 Joy Lynn White – background vocals ("Get Right With God", "Bus to Baton Rouge", "Broken Butterflies")

Charts

References

External links 
 
Lucinda Williams Official Website

Lucinda Williams albums
2001 albums
Lost Highway Records albums